Fabien Paschal (born April 17, 1991 in Creteil, France) is a French basketball player who plays for French Pro A League club Le Havre.

Career
Paschal signed a 3-year contract with BCM Gravelines in May 2014.

References

1991 births
Living people
BCM Gravelines players
French men's basketball players
Power forwards (basketball)
STB Le Havre players